DbA may refer to:

  A-weighted Decibels
 Dead by April